Areli Madrid Tovilla (born 18 February 1952) is a Mexican politician affiliated with the PRI. As of 2013 she served as Deputy of both the LX and LXII Legislatures of the Mexican Congress representing Chiapas. She also served as Senator during the LVIII and LIX Legislatures.

References

1952 births
Living people
Politicians from Chiapas
Members of the Senate of the Republic (Mexico)
Members of the Chamber of Deputies (Mexico)
Institutional Revolutionary Party politicians
21st-century Mexican politicians
21st-century Mexican women politicians
Women members of the Chamber of Deputies (Mexico)
Women members of the Senate of the Republic (Mexico)
20th-century Mexican politicians
20th-century Mexican women politicians
Meritorious Autonomous University of Puebla alumni
Autonomous University of Tlaxcala alumni
Members of the Congress of Chiapas